Zhangixalus hui is a species of frog in the family Rhacophoridae. It is endemic to China.

Its natural habitats are temperate forests, subtropical or tropical moist montane forests, subtropical or tropical moist shrubland, freshwater marshes, and intermittent freshwater marshes.
It is threatened by habitat loss.

References

hui
Amphibians of China
Endemic fauna of China
Taxonomy articles created by Polbot
Amphibians described in 1945